Wolfgang Schilling (born 18 March 1957) is a former professional East German footballer.

Schilling made 126 appearances in the DDR-Oberliga during his playing career.

Honours 
 1980 – FDGB-Pokal winner
 1981 – European Cup Winners' Cup runner-up

External links 
 Wolfgang Schilling on the FCC Wiki

1957 births
Living people
East German footballers
Association football defenders
FC Carl Zeiss Jena players
German footballers
DDR-Oberliga players